Jean-Louis Colliot-Thélène (born 2 December 1947), is a French mathematician. He is a Directeur de Recherches at CNRS at the Université Paris-Saclay in Orsay.
He studies mainly number theory and arithmetic geometry.

Awards

Prize of the French Academy of Sciences "Charles Louis de Saulces de Freycine" (1985)
Invited Speaker to the International Congress of Mathematicians (Berkeley 1986)
Fermat Prize for mathematical research (1991)
Grand prize of the French Academy of Sciences "Léonid Frank" (2009)
Fellow of the American Mathematical Society (2012)

References

External links
The personal web page of Jean-Louis Colliot-Thélène

Léonid Frank prize

1947 births
Number theorists
Paris-Sud University alumni
École Normale Supérieure alumni
20th-century French mathematicians
21st-century French mathematicians
Fellows of the American Mathematical Society
Living people
Academic staff of Paris-Saclay University